Anna Azari (born 27 August 1959) is an Israeli diplomat, and the current Ambassador of Israel to the Czech Republic. She has previously been Israel's Ambassador to Russia (2006–2010) and Poland (2014–2019).

Early life and education
She was born in Vilnius, Lithuanian Soviet Socialist Republic in 1959 and emigrated to Israel with her family in 1972. Azari attended the University of Haifa, earning a bachelor's degree in history and English literature and a master's in political science. She also garnered a Special Program in Russian Studies from Hebrew University and graduated from the National Security College.

Career
She has been in the Israeli Foreign Service since the 1980s, and lived in San Francisco from 1989 to 1992, serving as consul-general of Israel to the Pacific Northwest.

From 1995 to 1997 Azari was first secretary at the Embassy of Israel in Moscow. Beginning in 1999, she served as Ambassador of Israel to both Ukraine and Moldova and, before leaving the post in 2003, was described in the Ukrainian press as one of the country's most popular foreign diplomats.

On the day of the September 11 attacks, Azari was meeting with a delegation of physicians from Chicago and Atlanta-based Jewish Healthcare International to discuss their collaborative work with Ukrainian health professionals. The meeting was interrupted when they learned of the attacks and they watched news coverage of the attacks in the meeting room until the embassy was ordered to be evacuated. Following her tenure in Ukraine, Azari ran the Ministry's Eurasia Department where she handled relations with former Soviet states. During this time she was considered to be one of several candidates that Prime Minister Ariel Sharon could choose to appoint as head of Nativ.

She was appointed as ambassador to Russia by Foreign Minister Tzipi Livni in 2006 and presented her credentials to Russian President Vladimir Putin on 18 January 2007. Over the course of her tenure, Israel and Russia agreed to eliminate the visa requirement for tourists traveling between the two countries and Russia ended a deal to sell Iran S-300 surface-to-air missiles. Dorit Golander was chosen to replace Azari in 2009 and she left the post in the summer of 2010. In an interview with Rossiyskaya Gazeta prior to her departure, Azari stated that relations between Israel and Russia had improved markedly and that she saw the level of diplomatic activity nearing a par with Russia's relations with bigger countries, such as Germany.

Personal life
Azari is married to Rabbi Meir Azari who leads the Reform Judaism congregation of Beit Daniel in Tel Aviv and together they have two children. When her appointment as ambassador to Russia was announced, Greer Fay Cashman of The Jerusalem Post suggested her marriage could be a source of contention with orthodox religious communities in Russia.

References

External links 
 TAU Guest Speaker:Anna Azari, Ambassador of Israel to the Russian Federation, 2006–2010

Living people
Ambassadors of Israel to the Czech Republic
Ambassadors of Israel to Poland
Ambassadors of Israel to Russia
Ambassadors of Israel to Ukraine
1959 births
Diplomats from Vilnius
Israeli consuls
University of Haifa alumni
Hebrew University of Jerusalem alumni
Israeli women ambassadors
Soviet emigrants to Israel
Israeli people of Lithuanian-Jewish descent